Olszynka Grochowska is a subdistrict located in northern part of Praga-Południe, in south-east Warsaw. 
The subdistrict is mostly a forest area. Home to a nature reserve. Railway station is also located here. 

The area is commonly recognised due to the Battle of Olszynka Grochowska which took place on 25 February 1831 during the November Uprising.

References

Neighbourhoods of Praga-Południe